Thomas Brennan was an English footballer who played as an inside forward for Port Vale, Stockport County, and Stafford Rangers.

Career
Brennan joined Port Vale from Cobridge in August 1916. He made his debut at inside-right in a 1–0 defeat to Preston North End in a Football League, Lancashire Regional Section match at Deepdale on 5 January 1918. He was conscripted into the Army, but continued to play for Port Vale when he was in Staffordshire. He left the club in May 1919 and went on to play for Stockport County and Stafford Rangers.

Career statistics
Source:

References

Footballers from Staffordshire
English footballers
Association football inside forwards
Port Vale F.C. players
Stockport County F.C. players
Stafford Rangers F.C. players
English Football League players
British Army personnel of World War I